European Recycling Company is a German company that specialises in recycling clothes and footwear on behalf of charities. It gives a percentage of its profits to the charities. The company is owned by Nerses Ohanian, and is registered in Switzerland.

The company rebranded under the name SOEX UK in 2018.

References

Service companies of Switzerland
Recycling in the United Kingdom